Kyrie is a double album by Italian singer Mina released in 1980 as "Vol. 1" and "Vol. 2". On this album Mina experiments with various genres, especially rock. The cover of the album features Mina's son Massimiliano Pani dressed as a hockey player.

The album

"Musica", the opening track expresses a feeling of renewal. The use of the synthesizer and Mina’s voice creates an almost futuristic sound, a rarefied atmospheric sound.

This atmosphere sound collides with the roughness of "You Keep Me Hangin' On". On this track Mina sings with a richer and gravely and coarse tone, creating a roughness to this remake of a classic song.

With "Quatt’ore ‘e tiempo" and we have one of the few moments more classic and traditional. The lyrics tell of a sequence of images that chases almost dancing in the rhythm of the melody. Neapolitan drama away from the usual melodic Neapolitan, the song is a free implementation of the famous “Pietà Signor” composed by Alessandro Stradella.

"Chi sarà" is the composition by Simon Luca. The melody is charming and the simplicity of both the music and lyrics make for a great song. The layering of Mina’s voice adds an interesting layer to the production of the song.

"Voglio stare bene" is a song that has similarities to the melody structure as Bohemian Rhapsody by "Queen". The song begins dramatically and there are constant changes in the tempo, creating different hues.

The Shel Shapiro penned "I know" has a powerful chorus and with the sheer power of Mina’s voice makes for a great marriage of vocals and music.  
On Tra Napoli e un bicchiere the voices of Mina and Simon Luca play in unison to the endless intricate tones and scales to excellence.

The first volume ends with Capisco written by Massimiliano Pani. A disco-laced track with fast-paced lyrics and a thumping beat incorporating synthesisers.

The second volume starts off with  Fermerò qualcuno. The tone is dramatic and Mina sings with a sense of loneliness that is infused in every line of the text, with a lavish and engaging musical arrangement.

L'amore è bestia, l'amore è poeta has a reggae flavour to it, a new musical exploration for Mina.

A true musical gem on this album is a cover of the Beatles  She's Leaving Home . The arrangement is more sumptuous and less saccharine than the arrangement. Paul McCartney and John Lennon liked that arrangement that they sent a telegram of congratulations to Maestro Mario Robbiani.

Qualcosa in più is another defining moment of the album. The song structure and crescendo is musically innovative and sublime.

Colori has Mina explore the blues. The lyrics are beautiful and the arrangement transcendent. 
On the track Bambola gonfiabile the theme of exaggeration is essential. The song speaks of a Bambola gonfiabile (Inflatable doll) the music and lyrics are hard rock, sung so aggressively.

Radio is a song which lyrics are centred on jealousy. Touching tones and atmospheres at times poignant, given away by a base d 'fabulous arches and the magical sound of the flugelhorn.

Buonanotte, buonanotte is the ends volume two. The song has a lyrical sweetness in the verses and the sumptuousness arrangement of Massimiliano Pani.

Track listing

Vol.1

Vol.2

Musicians

Artist
 Mina- voice

Arrangements 
 Maurizio Anesa, William Marino - track 1 (Vol 1)
 Beppe Cantarelli - tracks 1, 7 (Vol 2)
 Massimiliano Pani - tracks 2, 8 (Vol 1) / tracks 2, 8 (Vol 2)
 Oscar Rocchi - track 3 (Vol 1)
 Mario Robbiani - track 3 (Vol 2)
 Shel Shapiro - track 6 (Vol 1)
 Simon Luca - tracks 4, 5, 7 (Vol 1) / tracks 4/6 (Vol 2)

Other musicians 
 Maurizio Anesa, Gigi Cappellotto, Flaviano Cuffari, Dino D'Autorio, Paolo Donnarumma - bass
 L. Alì, Walter Scebran, Walter Martino - drums
 Claudio Bazzari, Beppe Cantarelli, Sergio Farina, William Marino, Gilberto Ziglioli - guitar
 Hugo Heredia - flute
 Sergio Fanni, Sergio Farina - flugelhorn
 George Aghedo - percussioni
 Victor Bach, Oscar Rocchi - piano
 Aldo Banfi, William Marino, Simon Luca - synthesizer
 Victor Bach, M. Paretti, Oscar Rocchi - keyboard
 Simon Luca - vocals on the track "Tra Napoli e un bicchiere"
 Rossana Casale, Lella Esposito, Pino Ferro, Mina-, Silvio Pozzoli, Wanda Radicchi, J. Scott, Simon Luca, M. Teneggi - choir

References

1980 albums
Mina (Italian singer) albums